The Protocol Amending the Agreements, Conventions and Protocols on Narcotic Drugs concluded at The Hague on 23 January 1912, at Geneva on 11 February 1925 and 19 February 1925, and 13 July 1931, at Bangkok on 27 November 1931 and at Geneva on 26 June 1936 was a treaty, signed on 11 December 1946 at Lake Success, that shifted the drug control functions previously assigned to the League of Nations to the United Nations. As the Protocol's official title says, it modifies the provisions of the:
1912 and 1925 International Opium Conventions,
1931 Convention for Limiting the Manufacture and Regulating the Distribution of Narcotic Drugs, and the
1936 Convention for the Suppression of the Illicit Traffic in Dangerous Drugs.

Under this Protocol, the Commission on Narcotic Drugs, appointed by the UN Economic and Social Council, took over drug policy making from the League of Nations' Advisory Committee on Traffic in Opium and Other Dangerous Drugs. In an important precedent, the Supervisory Body that was created to administer the estimate system (which required nations to keep within their predetermined estimates of necessary narcotics production, imports, exports, etc.) was appointed by:
The World Health Organization (two members)
The Commission on Narcotic Drugs (one member)
The Permanent Central Board (one member).

The Supervisory Body's successor, the International Narcotics Control Board, also had 3 of its 13 members nominated by the World Health Organization, with the rest nominated by UN members, with nominations subject to approval by the UN Economic and Social Council. No doubt in both cases, lobbying by the pharmaceutical industries influenced the inclusion of a requirement to place some scientific and medical experts on the board. However, the influence of Harry J. Anslinger and his Canadian counterpart Charles Henry Ludovic Sharman, both narcotics control officials, could be seen in the decision to allow the Commission to select some members (thus allowing law enforcement officials to be appointed to the Supervisory Body).

In accordance with the provisions of the drug control treaties, the revisions instituted by the Protocol did not require ratification to enter into force. For each party, the treaty entered into force immediately upon their (a) signature without reservation as to approval, (b) signature subject to approval followed by acceptance or (c) acceptance. Since there were far fewer independent nations in the 1940s than there are today, the Protocol's initial 40 parties – including populous empires and unions such as the United Kingdom and Soviet Union – encompassed the vast majority of the world's population. As of 2013, the Protocol has 62 state parties; of the ratifying states, the Netherlands has denounced the treaty.

The Protocol was superseded by the Single Convention on Narcotic Drugs, except as it affected the 1936 Convention for the Suppression of the Illicit Traffic in Dangerous Drugs. However, the Protocol's influence can be plainly seen in the power structure established by the Single Convention, which remains in force.

References

 Cannabis: Our Position for a Canadian Public Policy, Report of the Senate Special Committee on Illegal Drugs, Sep. 2002.
 Protocol Amending the Agreements, Conventions and Protocols on Narcotic Drugs concluded at The Hague on 23 January 1912, at Geneva on 11 February 1925 and 19 February 1925, and 13 July 1931, at Bangkok on 27 November 1931 and at Geneva on 26 June 1936, Text of the treaty.

External links
 

Drug control treaties
Treaties concluded in 1946
Treaties entered into force in 1946
Treaties of the Kingdom of Afghanistan
Treaties of the People's Socialist Republic of Albania
Treaties of Argentina
Treaties of Australia
Treaties of Austria
Treaties of the Bahamas
Treaties of the Byelorussian Soviet Socialist Republic
Treaties of Belgium
Treaties of Bolivia
Treaties of the Second Brazilian Republic
Treaties of Canada
Treaties of Chile
Treaties of the Republic of China (1912–1949)
Treaties of Colombia
Treaties of the Czech Republic
Treaties of Czechoslovakia
Treaties of Denmark
Treaties of the Dominican Republic
Treaties of Ecuador
Treaties of the Kingdom of Egypt
Treaties of Fiji
Treaties of Finland
Treaties of the French Fourth Republic
Treaties of West Germany
Treaties of the Kingdom of Greece
Treaties of Haiti
Treaties of Honduras
Treaties of the Hungarian People's Republic
Treaties of British India
Treaties of Pahlavi Iran
Treaties of the Kingdom of Iraq
Treaties of Ireland
Treaties of Italy
Treaties of Japan
Treaties of Lebanon
Treaties of Liberia
Treaties of Liechtenstein
Treaties of Luxembourg
Treaties of Monaco
Treaties of Mexico
Treaties of New Zealand
Treaties of Nicaragua
Treaties of Norway
Treaties of Panama
Treaties of Papua New Guinea
Treaties of Peru
Treaties of the Philippines
Treaties of the Polish People's Republic
Treaties of the Socialist Republic of Romania
Treaties of the Soviet Union
Treaties of Saudi Arabia
Treaties of Serbia and Montenegro
Treaties of Yugoslavia
Treaties of Slovakia
Treaties of the Union of South Africa
Treaties of Francoist Spain
Treaties of Sweden
Treaties of Switzerland
Treaties of the Syrian Republic (1930–1963)
Treaties of Turkey
Treaties of the Ukrainian Soviet Socialist Republic
Treaties of the United Kingdom
Treaties of the United States
United Nations treaties
1946 in New York (state)
Treaties adopted by United Nations General Assembly resolutions
Treaties extended to the Faroe Islands
Treaties extended to Greenland
Treaties extended to Curaçao and Dependencies
Treaties extended to West Berlin